James Tanner Beason (born March 23, 1997) is an American professional soccer player who plays as a defender for Major League Soccer club San Jose Earthquakes.

Career

Youth, college & amateur 
Beason played as part of the USSDA academy side North Carolina Fusion, before heading to Stanford University in 2015 to play college soccer. After redshirting in 2015, Beason went on to play four seasons with the Cardinals, making 81 appearances, scoring 20 goals and tallying 11 assists. Beason was an NCAA National Champion three times (2015, 2016, 2017), First Team All-American twice (2018, 2019), First Team All-Pac-12 twice (2017, 2018), and the Pac-12 Player of the Year (2018). Beason was also a MAC Hermann Trophy semifinalists in both 2018 and 2019.

While at college, Beason appeared for USL League Two side North Carolina Fusion U23 in 2016, and San Francisco City in both 2018 and 2019.

Professional 
On December 30, 2019, Beason signed a senior contract with MLS ahead of the 2020 MLS SuperDraft. On January 9, 2020, Beason was selected 12th overall in the SuperDraft by San Jose Earthquakes.

Beason made his professional debut on August 29, 2020, starting in a 3–2 loss to LA Galaxy.

References

External links 
 Tanner Beason - Men's Soccer Seton Hall bio
 

1997 births
Living people
All-American men's college soccer players
American soccer players
Association football defenders
North Carolina Fusion U23 players
Major League Soccer players
People from Winston-Salem, North Carolina
San Francisco City FC players
San Jose Earthquakes draft picks
San Jose Earthquakes players
Soccer players from North Carolina
Stanford Cardinal men's soccer players
USL League Two players